Ritwik Ghatak was an Indian filmmaker and also a playwright poet and writer of short stories. Ghatak started his creative career as a poet and a fiction writer. Then he began writing for the theater and became involved with Gananatya Sangha and Indian People's Theatre Association. Later he moved to film direction. He also wrote more than 50 essays on film. Satyajit Ray wrote that these essays "cover(ed) every possible aspect of the cinema".

Filmography

Films

Director and scriptwriter

Story & scriptwriter

Actor

Short films and documentaries 

 The Life of the Adivasis (1955)
 Places of Historic Interest in Bihar (1955)
 Oraon (1957)
 Scissors (1962)
 Ustad Alauddin Khan (1963)
 Fear (1965)
 Rendezvous (1965)
 Civil Defence (1965)
 Scientists of Tomorrow (1967)
 Yeh Kyon (Why/The Question) (1970)
 Amar Lenin (My Lenin) (1970)
 Puruliar Chhau (The Chhau Dance of Purulia) (1970)
 Durbar Gati Padma (The Turbulent Padma) (1971)

Incomplete films and documentaries 

 Bedeni (1951)
 Kato Ajanare (1959)
 Bagalar Banga Darshan (1964–65)
 Ronger Golam (1968)
 Indira Gandhi (1972)
 Ramkinkar (1975)

Films on Ritwik Ghatak 
 Ekti Nadir Naam (The Name of a River) (2002) by Anup Singh.
 Meghe Dhaka Tara (2013) directed by Kamaleshwar Mukherjee.

Screenplays aborted before shooting 
 Raja (1956)
 Amritokumbher Sandhane (1957)
 Akal Basonto (1957)
 Arjan Sardar (1958)
 Balidan (1962)
 Aranyak (1963)
 Nakshi Kanthar Math (1963)
 Elephant taming in Gouripur (1963)
 Shyam Se Neha Lagei (1964)
 Janmabhumi (Pandit Mashai) (1965)
 Chaturanga (1966)
 Hirer Prajapati (1966)
 Sansar Simante (1968)
 Echoes from Vietnam in Bengal (1968)
 Kumar Sambhaber Ashtom Swargo (1969)
 Sat Lahari
 Natun Phasal
 Ajay and Gabroo
 Those forgotte ones
 Shei Bishnupriya (1974)
 Mannequin (1974)
 Hath
 Princess Kalaboti
 Buddhu Bhutum (1975)
 Lojja (1975)

Theatre 
 Chandragupto (Dwijendralal Ray), actor
 Achalayoton (Tagore) (1943), director and actor
 Kalo Sayor (Ghatak) (1947–48), actor and director
 Kalonko (Bhattacharya) (1951), actor
 Dolil (Ghatak) (1952), actor and director
 Kato Dhane Kato Chaal (Ghatak)(1952)
 Officer (Gogol) (1953), actor,
 Ispaat (Ghatak) (1954–55), un-staged
 Khorir Gondi (Brecht)
 Galileo Chorit (Brecht)
 Jagoran (Atindra Mozumdar), actor
 Jalonto (Ghatak)
 Jwala (Ghatak)
 Dakghar (Tagore)
 Dheu (Biru Mukhopadhay)
 Dhenki Swarge geleo Dhan bhane (Ghatak/Panu Paul)
 Natir Puja (Tagore)
 Nabanna (Bhattacharya)
 Nildarpan (Dinabandhu Mitra), actor
 Nicher Mahal (Gorky), un-staged
 Netajike nie (Ghatak)
 Poritran (Tagore)
 Falguni (Tagore)
 Bidyasagar (Banaphool)
 Bisarjan (Tagore)
 Vangabandor (Panu Paul), actor
 Voter vet (Panu Paul), actor
 Musanfiro ke lie (Gorky), actor
 Macbeth (Shakespeare), actor
 Raja (Tagore)
 Sanko (Ghatak), actor
 Sei Meye (Ghatak), director
 Strir Patro (Tagore)
 Hojoborala (Sukumar Ray)
 Pashanda Pandit

Bibliography

Books 

 Ritwik Ghatak stories 
 Galileo Charit (Bengali translation of Brecht's Life of Galileo)
 Chalachitra, Manush Ebong Aro Kichu Dey's publishers 
 Cinema and I, Ritwik Memorial Trust, Kolkata
 On the cultural "Front", Ritwik Memorial Trust
 Rows and Rows of Fences: Ritwik Ghatak on Cinema, Seagull Books Pvt. Ltd, Kolkata 
 Ritwik Ghatak Stories, Translated from Bengali by Rani Ray, New Delhi, Shrishti publishers and distributors

Short stories
 Akashgangar srot dhore
 Ezahar
 Shikha
 Ecstasy
 Rupkotha
 Raja
 Parashpathar
 Bhuswarga Achanchal
 Sphotik Patro
 Chokh
 Comrade
 Sarak
 Prem
 Jhankar
 Mar

Articles and essays on film

References

Sources
Primary sources

Citations

Ritwik Ghatak
Male actor filmographies
Bibliographies by writer
Indian filmographies
Bibliographies of Indian writers
Indian plays by writer